Rishavn is a beach on Korsneset just outside Krokeide in the city of Bergen in Vestland county, Norway. The beach is mostly used by naturists.

Nude beaches
Beaches of Norway
Bergen
Landforms of Vestland